Rjavče is a small village in the hills northwest of  Ilirska Bistrica in the Inner Carniola region of Slovenia.

The local church in the settlement is dedicated to Saint Maurus and belongs to the Parish of Pregarje.

References

External links

Rjavče on Geopedia

Populated places in the Municipality of Ilirska Bistrica